Dolgoma cribrata is a moth of the family Erebidae first described by Otto Staudinger in 1887. It is found in eastern Asia, more specifically Russia (Amur, Primorye), China (Heilongjiang, Sichuan, Yunan), Korea and Japan.

The wingspan is 22–30 mm.

References

Moths described in 1887
Dolgoma
Moths of Japan